is the 14th major single by the Japanese idol group Cute, released on December 1, 2010 on the Zetima label.

Track listing

CD single

Event V

Charts

Sales and certifications

References

External links 
 
 
 会いたいロンリークリスマス C-ute's official blog

2010 singles
Japanese-language songs
Japanese Christmas songs
Cute (Japanese idol group) songs
Songs written by Tsunku
Song recordings produced by Tsunku
Zetima Records singles
2010 songs